The  is one of the most important motorways in Italy, as it connects Pianura padana, the city of Modena and the A1 motorway to Austria through the Brenner Pass, located in the municipality of Brenner.

The operator of the road is Autostrada del Brennero S.p.A.

History 
Yet in 1949, during the Geneva Convention on Road Traffic, it was designed a route, identified as E56, leading from Scandinavia to the southernmost point of Italy. The current Autobrennero track was already part of that route plan.

The next step for the fulfillment of the project was the foundation of Autostrada del Brennero S.p.A., on 20 February 1959, that two years later was given the concession for the building and the following management of the highway. Autostrada del Brennero S.p.A. is still the company which curates A22 infrastructure. The motorway track was initially designed by Bruno and Lino Gentilini, assisted by senator Guido de Unterrichter. The first plan was then edited, and it was made up by two carriageway, 7,5 × 2 metres each. The project Verona-Brenner was approved by ANAS on 25 January 1962, while the segment Verona-Modena was approved during the following year. Later on, several plots of land had to be dispossessed, underpasses and flyovers had to be built (for both roads and railroads), 307 kilometers of power lines and 74 km of telephone lines even had to be moved away. It all required about 23 billion lira.

In 1963 it was approved the definitive track plan and, also thanks to international loans, the realization began. The first segment open to the public – 50 km between Bolzano and Trento – was inaugurated on 21 December 1968. The first motorway traffic between Italy and Austria occurred on 5 April 1971.

After the opening of other segments, the highway could be considered as definitely completed on 11 April 1974, with the inauguration of the section between Chiusa and Bolzano, resulting the most complicated one due to the complex infrastructural and engineering work. Overall, at that time 21 entrance-and-exit toll booth and 12 service stations were opened.

At that time the overall cost of A22 amounted to 243 721 821 000 lire, so about 780 millions lire per kilometer. Just in 1984 highway A22 managed to have its first net profit.

During the years, the expressway A22 had been subjected to few track modifications; mostly, toll booth have been opened or closed. For instance:

 "Bressanone sud – Zona industriale (= industrial area)": opened just for the ones heading north or coming from north. It is expected the opening toward the other direction, too;  
 "Trento sud": opened on 3 May 2011, costed 17,5 million euro, including the new bridge above Adige;  
 "Trento centro (= center)": only the highway exits (not entrance ones) have been closed since 23 May 2011.

Nowadays, the motorway consists of 313,5 km of track, with 23 entrance toll booth, 22 exit toll booth, 6 security centers, 6 service centers, and 22 gas stations.

Features 
With a total of 313 km of highway track, A22 originates near Modena, at the interchange on motorway A1, not far from Modena Nord toll booth. After Modena, the motorway traverses the whole Pianura padana, overshooting Carpi and Mantua, in the real Po Valley heart. In Verona A22 crosses highway A4, afterwards it settles in the Adige Valley, in parallel to Lake Garda. It goes past Rovereto, then passing through Trento and Bolzano. From here, it sets inside the Isarco Valley (known in German as 'Eisacktal'), tighter than Po and Adige valleys. Therefore, here A22 twists and turns through the valley, easily overtaking Bressanone and then going over Vipiteno toll booth. Finally, A22 reaches the Brenner Pass in Brennero, where it gets the Austrian border and comes to its end. Here, the passageway Modena-Munich goes on crossing the boundary, following the Austrian A13 Brenner Autobahn. As it clearly appears, A22 is a strongly important highway for connections and transports between Southern and Northern Europe, designed on a track studied and planned to make use of one of the lowest mountain passes in the Alps, the Brenner Pass – one of the busiest borders in Europe – located at only 1375 m above sea level.

Statistical studies calculated that this expressway moves 30–40 thousand vehicles per day (among them, approximately a third are heavy vehicles), with higher peaks during holiday transfers; sometimes the circulation of traffic comes to a standstill, because of this congestion, causing several serious breakings, queues and small accidents and rear-end collisions, also due to the limitation of the track at just two lanes. To avoid these problems, it is suggested and incentivized the use of intermodal freight transport for the heavy vehicles, taking them onto specific wagons or boxcars, and the conveyance abroad from Verona by railway.

A22 guardrails, whose brown colour is very typical, are made in Corten Steel, an alloy showing elevated corrosion resistance rates and high mechanical strength.

Traffic news in Trentino-Alto Adige are provided by Radio NBC (in Italian) and radio Südtirol 1 (in German), whereas in the remaining section are broadcast by radio Pico.

Track 
The highway is 315 km long: the track begins nearby Modena, at the junction with A1 motorway, and vertically crosses the whole Northern Italy, finally reaching at the Brenner Pass, along the Austrian border. Once over the boundary, the expressway is connected with A13 Austrian motorway (Brennerautobahn A13, Innsbruck-Brenner). A22 highway passes through four Italian regions (Trentino-Alto Adige, Veneto, Lombardia, Emilia-Romagna). The management of the road has been assigned since its construction to specific concessionaires and motorway maintenance companies.

European roads 
A22 highway, inside the network of European roads, is part for its entire track of the north–south route E45, connecting Karesuando and Gela. The main intersection with the west–east routes is with E70 (in that point represented by Italian motorway A4) in Verona.

Signage 
Signage is bilingual: both in Italian and in German, due to the fact that in the province of Bolzano German is mostly spoken.

Track table

Works and projects

Dynamic lane 
In the section between Trento Sud and Rovereto Nord, is ongoing the experimentation of the so-called "third dynamic lane", which includes the use of the breakdown lane as a normal drive lane when occurring particular situations such as traffic congestions. This is signalled to drivers by determined lightning Variable-message signs along the route: they display green arrows if the breakdown lane is usable as a normal lane, oblique yellow arrows if the third lane is being shut down, and red crosses if the third lane is closed and can be used only in case of emergency. This project includes the use of the dynamic lane technique also in the segment between Bolzano Sud and Verona Nord tollbooths, where it is scheduled to take place the interchange with the third permanent lane (which is going to be built) up to the intersection with motorway A1 in Modena.

Third lane 
By 2016 the work for the realisation of the third motorway lane in the segment between Verona Nord toll booth and the intersection with highway A1 in Modena Nord had begun. In this last section, the interchange will be enlarged enough to satisfy the needs of the constantly rising traffic. Moreover, it will be already prearranged for the future add-on towards Sassuolo (through a beltway). For this extension of the motorway, no land expropriations are planned to be brought. Instead, the already present 11 meters of central reservation between the two carriageways will be used. This intervention also provides for the widening of the hard shoulder of about one meter. Furthermore, it is planned the building of lay-by stopping places every 500 meters.

Beltway Campogalliano-Sassuolo 
The project about the elongation of the A22 heading South, from the junction of Campogalliano to Sassuolo, 14 km long and provided with 6 tollbooths, has been approved in 2005 by ANAS Governing Body. The beginning of the work, which has been subcontracted to the temporary enterprise association Autocs (made up by Autostrada del Brennero spa, Coopsette, Impresa Pizzarotti & C., Cordioli, Edilizia Wipptal, Oberosler, and Consorzio stabile Coseam Italia), is due in May 2018. Works will last four years, for a total amount of 516 million euro.

The executive project provides for the realisation of 25,5 km of road in total, 14 km of which represented by the above-mentioned highway add-on Campogalliano-Sassuolo, 6 km constituting the new Rubiera south bypass (with extra 1,4 km for the joint), and 3,6 km for the joint with Modena ring road. Two viaducts are planned to be built to cross river Secchia (814 m) and to overpass via Emilia and Milano-Bologna railway beam (621 m), and two underground tunnels to shield the natural oasis in Colombarone di Formigine, in addition to 15 underpasses and 12 flyovers for the secondary traffic stream.

Ti.Bre. (beltway with A15) 
Ti.Bre project (Italian acronym for Tyrrhenian-Brenner) includes the lengthening of highway A15 La Spezia-Parma northbound, from Fontevivo (Parma Ovest) to Nogarole Rocca tollbooth on A22, consisting in 85 km in total.

In March 2017, 12 km out of the 85 km planned were under construction, for a total amount of 2,7 billion euro. The link ends in San Quirico di Trecasali (Parma).

Trento and Rovereto urban bypass 
In order to solve the traffic problems inside the cities of Trento and Rovereto, it is under consideration of the Autonomous Province of Trento the free use of the highway in the sections between the tollbooths of Trento Nord and Sud, and Rovereto Nord and Sud. In particular, in the city of Rovereto, not being served by its own ring road, often occur long queues and traffic jams, frequently causing delays and accidents, like car crashes or rear-end collisions. The study provides for the gratuitousness of the segments between the said tollbooths just for the citizens who entered and exited at the toll booths at issue. The idea seems to be preferable for mainly two reasons. Above all, the elevated construction costs of the potential building of an orbital road around Rovereto, about 200 millions euro against about one million euro per year as pledged by the agreement between the Province and A22. Moreover, the idea is also preferable for the strongly lower environmental and panoramic impact compared to the building of a new ring road.

Hydrogen highway 
A22 was due to be the first "hydrogen highway" all over Europe. Indeed, by 2010, the motorway was planned to be served by a hydrogen supply system, based upon the California Hydrogen Net (CaH2Net), realised due to the will of the governor of the State of California Arnold Schwarzenegger. Hydrogen, not present in nature in his free form, must be produced by petroleum or by alternative sources: in line with the severe environmental safeguard adopted in the area of Bolzano, the propellant was due to be produced by renewable sources.

After prolonged hesitations by both the province and A22, led respectively by Luis Durnwalder and Silvano Grisenti, in 2013 the works for the realisation of the hydrogen production plant got underway, despite the fact that yet in 2012 no decisions were made.

In summer 2014, the plant was finished, supplying a new fuel station nearby Bolzano Sud tollbooth, inaugurated at the end of November.

Trento Sud toll booth 
On 3 May 2011 Trento Sud tollbooth was opened, and it allowed to redirect the traffic circulation on Trento orbital road whenever the motorway is partially or totally shut down. However, with the opening of Trento Sud tollbooth, Trento Centro (= center) one has been closed outbound.

References

External links
 A22 motorway Official Website

1968 establishments in Italy
Autostrade in Italy
Transport in Emilia-Romagna
Transport in Lombardy
Transport in Veneto
Transport in Trentino-Alto Adige/Südtirol